Jamie's Dream School is a seven-part British television documentary series made by Fresh One Productions, first aired on Channel 4. In it, Jamie Oliver enrols a group of teenagers with fewer than five GCSEs into his "Dream School" – a school in which lessons are taught by celebrities who are specialists in particular subjects. Both pupils and teachers gave evidence to the Education Select Committee in June 2011.

The lessons from the show are available through a dedicated YouTube channel, which features David Starkey's history course and Simon Callow's drama lessons.

The school
An empty building was converted into a school for two months. On the grounds, a biosphere was constructed for lessons on the environment.

Teachers
Head Teacher: John D'Abbro, OBE
Art: Rolf Harris 
Cooking: Jamie Oliver OBE
Cricket: Michael Vaughan OBE
Diving: Daley Thompson CBE
English: Simon Callow CBE
History: Dr David Starkey CBE
Latin: Prof. Dame Mary Beard DBE
Law (Human Rights): Cherie Blair, CBE
Maths: Alvin Hall
Music: Jazzie B, OBE
Photography: John "Rankin" Waddell
Poetry:  Sir Andrew Motion
Politics: Alastair Campbell
Sailing: Dame Ellen MacArthur DBE
Science (Biology): Prof. Lord Winston
Science (Environment): Jane Poynter

Pupils
Angelique — Age 17
Aysha — Age 17
Codie West — Age 18
Charlotte — Age 17
Chloe — Age 17
Conor — Age 17
Danielle Harold — Age 18
Emily Brown — Age 16
Georgia — Age 18
Harlem-Iaren — Age 18
Henry — Age 17
Jake — Age 16
Jamal — Age 18
Jenny — Age 16
Jourdelle — Age 18
Latoya — Age 19
Michael — Age 18
Nana Kwame — Age 18
Ricki — Age 16
Ronnie — Age 18

International adaptations
A South African and an American adaptation were aired in late 2013.

A Dutch version of 8 episodes (and a reunion episode seven months later) followed in early 2017 on public broadcaster Omroep NTR hosted by kickboxing-champion Lucia Rijker and headmaster Eric van 't Zelfde. The first season included Maarten van Rossem, Karin Bloemen and Peter R. de Vries as celebrity-teachers. A second season (10 episodes) started on 26 February 2018. Teachers were Eva Jinek, Duncan Stutterheim and Joseph Klibansky among others.The third series (11 episodes and a reunion 9 months later) started on 18 February 2019. Floortje Dessing, Trijntje Oosterhuis, Wilfred Genee, Ahmet Polat and Lodewijk Asscher and others were teaching the class of season three. The fourth season, of 13 episodes, started on 3 March 2020. Klaas Dijkhoff, Jimmy Nelson, Hanneke Groenteman and Sylvana Simons were some of the teachers.

References

2011 British television series debuts
2011 British television series endings
2010s high school television series
British high school television series
Channel 4 documentary series
English-language television shows
Television series about teenagers